Mien-Chie Hung (born September 4, 1950) is a Taiwanese-born American molecular biologist and cancer researcher. He is a Professor and Chair, Department of Molecular and Cellular Oncology, The University of Texas MD Anderson Cancer Center in Houston, Texas.

He was elected as a member of the Taiwan's Academia Sinica in 2002.

Hung received his bachelor's and master's degrees in Chemistry and biochemistry from National Taiwan University in Taipei, Taiwan.
In 1983, Hung earned his PhD degree in biochemistry from Brandeis University, in the United States.
In 1984, he worked at Massachusetts Institute of Technology, under the supervision of world-renowned molecular biologist, Dr. Robert A. Weinberg.

In 2006, Hung became the honorary director of Center for Molecular Medicine of China Medical University Hospital and a distinguished professor.

In 2019, Hung will become the president of China Medical University, Taichung, Taiwan.

References
MD Anderson Cancer Center - Mien-Chie Hung, Ph.D.

1950 births
Living people
Cancer researchers
Molecular biologists
Members of Academia Sinica
National Taiwan University alumni
Brandeis University alumni
Taiwanese emigrants to the United States
University of Texas MD Anderson Cancer Center faculty
Scientists from Kaohsiung